The 2019 New England Revolution season is the team's 24th season of existence, and their 24th season in Major League Soccer, the top-flight of American soccer.

Current squad

Staff

Out 

|-

|-

|-

|-

|-

|-

|-

|-

|}

Matches and Results

Exhibitions

MLS

U.S. Open Cup

The Revolution will enter the 2019 U.S. Open Cup with the rest of Major League Soccer in the fourth round.

References 

New England Revolution
New England Revolution
New England Revolution seasons
New England Revolution
Sports competitions in Foxborough, Massachusetts